Romie L. Hamilton (July 29, 1922 – December 15, 2005) was an American football coach.  He was the 21st head football coach at The Apprentice School in Newport News, Virginia and he held that position for the 1965 season.  His coaching record at Apprentice was 0–8–1.
 He attended West Virginia University Institute of Technology and Dunbar High School.

Hamilton also coached Warwick High School in Newport News, being named head coach there in 1956.

References

1922 births
2005 deaths
The Apprentice Builders football coaches
High school football coaches in Virginia
West Virginia University Institute of Technology alumni